P. C. D. Nambiar was an Indian career banker who served as the eighth Chairman of State Bank of India.

Life 

He was born and raised in the Indian city of Chennai.

He died on 28 May 2012 in Chennai.

Career

Early career 

He has joined the State Bank of India as a probationary officer and served in a number of roles. He also served as the chief manager of the Thalassery branch in Kerala.

Banking career 

He served as the eighth Chairman of State Bank of India from 23 May 1977 until 13 December 1982.

After his retirement in 1982, he was succeeded by V. S. Natarajan as the Chairman of State Bank of India.

Later career 

After having retired from the State Bank of India in 1982, he was appointed as a director and board member at many private companies including Reliance Industries and Western India Plywood Limited.

He also served as vice-chairman of the now defunct Dubai Bank.

References

External links 

 SBI chairmen
 SBI history

Indian bankers
State Bank of India
Chairmen of the State Bank of India
Indian corporate directors
People from Chennai